This is a list of the players who are on the rosters of the teams participating in the 2008 Beijing Olympics for women's handball.

Group A

The following is the Angola roster in the women's handball tournament of the 2008 Summer Olympics.

Head coach: Jerónimo Neto

The following is the China roster in the women's handball tournament of the 2008 Summer Olympics.

Head coach:  Kang Jae-won

The following is the France roster in the women's handball tournament of the 2008 Summer Olympics.

Head coach: Olivier Krumbholz

The following is the Kazakhstan roster in the women's handball tournament of the 2008 Summer Olympics.

Head coach: Lev Yaniyev

The following is the Norway roster in the women's handball tournament of the 2008 Summer Olympics.

Head coach: Marit Breivik

The following is the Romania roster in the women's handball tournament of the 2008 Summer Olympics.

Head coach: Gheorghe Tadici

Group B

The following is the Brazil roster in the women's handball tournament of the 2008 Summer Olympics.

Head coach:  Juan Oliver

The following is the Germany roster in the women's handball tournament of the 2008 Summer Olympics.

Head coach: Armin Emrich

The following is the Hungary roster in the women's handball tournament of the 2008 Summer Olympics.

Head coach: János Hajdu

The following is the South Korea roster in the women's handball tournament of the 2008 Summer Olympics.

Head coach: Lim Young-chul

The following is the Russia roster in the women's handball tournament of the 2008 Summer Olympics.

Head coach: Yevgeni Trefilov

The following is the Sweden roster in the women's handball tournament of the 2008 Summer Olympics.

Head coach: Ulf Schefvert

References

Women's team rosters
2008 Summer Olympics

Olymp
Women's events at the 2008 Summer Olympics